Lilith is the third album by the American heavy metal band Butcher Babies. It was released on October 27, 2017, through Century Media Records and was produced by Steve Evetts. It is the band's first release with drummer Chase Brickenden and their final release with bassist Jason Klein before his departure from the band in 2019. The album reached number 11 on the Billboard Independent Albums chart, and number 15 on the Billboard Hard Rock Albums chart. The standard edition of the album contains 11 tracks; the deluxe edition includes 5 bonus tracks from the band's 2014 covers EP Uncovered. The album art, insert panel and tour posters were designed by American Artist Justin Paul

Reception
Loudwire noted that "There's no question Butcher Babies are a polarizing band who have some detractors, but Lilith will certainly earn them plenty of new converts,", while Metal Hammer voiced a similar opinion with "Lilith could be the Butcher Babies album that finally wins over the band’s naysayers."

Track listing

Personnel
Butcher Babies
Heidi Shepherd – vocals
Carla Harvey – vocals
Henry Flury – guitars
Jason Klein – bass
Chase Brickenden – drums

Production
Steve Evetts – production
Justin Paul – art design

Charts

References

2017 albums
Butcher Babies albums